The 1987 All-Big Eight Conference football team consists of American football players chosen by various organizations for All-Big Eight Conference teams for the 1987 NCAA Division I-A football season.  The selectors for the 1987 season included the Associated Press (AP).

Offensive selections

Quarterbacks
 Steve Taylor, Nebraska (AP-1)

Running backs
 Thurman Thomas, Oklahoma State (AP-1)
 Keith Jones, Nebraska (AP-1)
 Joe Henderson, Iowa State (AP-1)

Tight ends
 Keith Jackson, Oklahoma (AP-1)

Wide receivers
 Hart Lee Dykes, Oklahoma State (AP-1)

Centers
 Bob Latham, Oklahoma (AP-1)

Down linemen
 Anthony Phillips, Oklahoma (AP-1)
 Greg Johnson, Oklahoma (AP-1)
 Mark Hutson, Oklahoma (AP-1)
 John McCormick, Nebraska (AP-1)

Defensive selections

Defensive ends
 Darrell Reed, Oklahoma (AP-1)
 Broderick Thomas, Nebraska (AP-1)

Down lineman
 Neil Smith, Nebraska (AP-1)
 Tim Rather, Nebraska (AP-1)
 Kyle Rappold, Colorado (AP-1)

Linebackers
 Dante Jones, Oklahoma (AP-1)
 Eric McCarty, Colorado (AP-1)

Defensive backs
 Rickey Dixon, Oklahoma (AP-1)
 David Vickers, Oklahoma (AP-1)
 Erik McMillan, Missouri (AP-1)
 Mickey Pruitt, Colorado (AP-1)

Special teams

Place-kicker
 Jeff Shudak, Iowa State (AP-1)

Punter
 Barry Helton, Colorado (AP-1)

Key

AP = Associated Press

See also
 1987 College Football All-America Team

References

All-Big Seven Conference football team
All-Big Eight Conference football teams